Kexby is a village and civil parish in the unitary authority of the City of York in North Yorkshire, England.

The village was part of the East Riding of Yorkshire until 1974. It was part of the Selby District in North Yorkshire from 1974 until 1996. Since then it has been part of the City of York unitary authority.

According to the 2001 census the parish had a population of 194, it increased to 231 at the 2011 Census.

In 1823 Kexby had a population of 149. Occupations included ten farmers and the landlord of the Coach and Horses public house.

The route of the White Rose Way, a long-distance walk from Leeds to Scarborough, North Yorkshire passes through.

Kexby Old Bridge over the River Derwent is a Scheduled Ancient Monument with a Grade II listing. Once a toll bridge, it was built in 1650 by Sir Roger Tresuer.

Former Emmerdale actor Frazer Hines has a stud farm here.

References

External links

Villages in the City of York
Civil parishes in North Yorkshire